A by-election for the constituency of Southwark Central in the United Kingdom House of Commons was held on 29 April 1948, caused by the resignation of the incumbent Labour MP John Hanbury Martin. The result was a hold for the Labour Party, with their candidate Roy Jenkins, who was to become a prominent figure in British politics throughout the 1960s, 1970s and 1980s.

Result

Previous election

References

 Craig, F. W. S. (1983) [1969]. British parliamentary election results 1918-1949 (3rd edition ed.). Chichester: Parliamentary Research Services. . 
 

Southwark Central,1948
Southwark Central by-election
Southwark Central by-election
Southwark Central,1948
Southwark Central by-election